Colonel Edward Chaplin (28 March 1842 – 23 December 1883) was a British Conservative politician.

Background
Chaplin was the son of Reverend Henry Chaplin and Caroline Horatia, daughter of William Ellice. Henry Chaplin, 1st Viscount Chaplin, was his elder brother.

Political career
Chaplin sat as Member of Parliament for Lincoln alongside Charles Seely between 1874 and 1880.

Family
Chaplin married Lady Guendolen Theresa, daughter of Charles Chetwynd-Talbot, 19th Earl of Shrewsbury, in 1877. He died in December 1883, aged 41. His wife later remarried and died in January 1937.

References

External links 
 

1842 births
1883 deaths
Conservative Party (UK) MPs for English constituencies
UK MPs 1874–1880
Politics of Lincoln, England